The 2022 World Rugby Pacific Nations Cup was the fifteenth edition of the Pacific Nations Cup annual international rugby union competition and the first since 2019, with a 2-year lay-off due to the COVID-19 pandemic.

Four teams competed, with Fiji, Samoa and Tonga all returning to the competition with the addition of Australia A who re-joined the competition for the first time since 2008.

Fiji hosted the entire tournament for the first time since 2018, with Suva and Lautoka hosting matches over three Saturdays in the July test window. The competition will be played in a round-robin format with the Pacific Nations Cup winner determined by the highest number of competition points at the end of the tournament, with a win worth four points, a draw two points and bonus points for scoring four or more tries or losing by seven points or less.

Samoa won the title after winning all three games, the fourth time that have done this and the first since a joint title in 2014, or an individual title in 2012.

Standings

Fixtures

Round 1

Notes:
 Nigel Ah Wong, Ere Enari, Marco Fepulea'i, Fritz Lee, Aki Seiuli, Danny Toala, Andrew Tuala and Lolagi Visinia (all Samoa) made their international debuts.

Notes:
 Vinaya Habosi, Ratu Peni Matawalu, Isoa Nasilasila, Rusiate Nasove, Kalaveti Ravouvou and Seta Tamanivalu (all Fiji) and Joe Apikotoa, Tima Fainga'anuku, Malakai Fekitoa, Israel Folau, William Havili, Lotu Inisi, Manu Paea, Charles Piutau, Veikoso Poloniati, Sione Havili Talitui, Siate Tokolahi and Anzelo Tuitavuki (all Tonga) made their international debuts.
 This is the first time since 1932 that Tonga have failed to score points against Fiji.

Round 2

Notes:
 Feao Fotuaika and Semisi Paea (all Tonga) made their international debuts.

Round 3

Notes:
 Michael Curry (Samoa) made his international debut.
 This is the first time that Samoa has beaten Fiji since 2014.

Player statistics

Most points

Most tries

Squads

Note: Number of caps and players' ages are indicated as of 2 July 2022 – the tournament's opening day, pre first tournament match.

Australia A
On 15 June, Australia A named a 29-man squad for the 2022 World Rugby Pacific Nations Cup.

On 17 June, Hugh Sinclair joined the squad to replace Ryan McCauley who withdrew from the squad, whilst James Tuttle also joined the squad.

On 20 June, Harry Johnson-Holmes joined up with the Wallabies squad for their test series against England.

On 24 June, Ned Hanigan joined up with the Wallabies squad as injury cover for Jed Holloway.

As a result of Johnson-Holmes Wallabies called up and subsequent injury, Archer Holz was called up to the squad. Hudson Creighton also joined up with the squad.

On 5 July, Reece Hodge joined up with the Wallabies, with Lawson Creighton replacing Hodge in the 'A' side.

Fiji
On 6 June, a 34-man squad was named for the 2022 World Rugby Pacific Nations Cup.

On 29 June, Kitione Kamikamica joined up with the squad as cover for Te Ahiwaru Cirikidaveta.

Samoa
On 2 June, the following 30 players were called up for the 2022 World Rugby Pacific Nations Cup with Olajuwon Noah later being added to the squad.

Tonga
On 27 May, the following 31 players were called up for the 2022 World Rugby Pacific Nations Cup as well as the 2023 Rugby World Cup Asia/Pacific play-off qualifier.

On 3 June, Sione Havili was called up to the squad.

On the 16th of June, Lopeti Timani was called up to the squad.

Feao Fotuaika, Semisi Paea, Otumaka Mausia, Aisea Halo, and Telusa Veainu were called up to the squad.

See also
 2022 July rugby union tests

References

External links
 Pacific Nations Cup web page at World Rugby

World Rugby Nations Cup
World Rugby
World Rugby
Pacific Nations Cup